Dominic Chan Choi-hi (born 15 January 1956 in Hong Kong) was the member of the Central and Western District Council since 1988 until he lost his seat in 2019. He represented Shek Tong Tsui. He was the also member of the Provisional Legislative Council. He was the member of the Meeting Point and then the Democratic Party until he was expelled from the party in 1996 when he joined the Provisional Legislative Council in which the party boycotted it. He co-founded the think tank New Century Forum in 1999.

References

1956 births
Living people
Members of the Provisional Legislative Council
Members of the Urban Council of Hong Kong
District councillors of Central and Western District
Democratic Party (Hong Kong) politicians
Meeting Point politicians
New Century Forum politicians
University of Toronto alumni
Members of the Election Committee of Hong Kong, 2012–2017
Members of the Election Committee of Hong Kong, 2017–2021